Avio Lucioli (1 September 1928 – 23 December 2021) was an Italian hammer thrower who competed at the 1952 Summer Olympics, Lucioli died in Campi Bisenzio on 23 December 2021, at the age of 93.

References

External links
 

1928 births
2021 deaths
Athletes (track and field) at the 1952 Summer Olympics
Italian male hammer throwers
Olympic athletes of Italy
Sportspeople from Florence
20th-century Italian people
21st-century Italian people